Beckton United Football Club was a football club based in Beckton, England. The club primarily played in the Spartan League.

History
In 1966, Geevor was formed by Martin Evanson and George Raffelli. In 1975, the club changed its name to Beckton United. Whilst playing in the Spartan League, the club entered the FA Vase 11 times, reaching the third round in the 1985–86 season, before losing 3–0 at home to Stevenage Borough. In 1996, the club folded.

Ground
In 1972, the club moved to The Manorway in Beckton, after playing at Wanstead Flats. During the 1978–79 London Spartan League season, Beckton United played at Woodford Town’s Snakes Lane ground.

Records
Best league position: 5th in the London Spartan League, 1981–82, 1982–83
Best FA Vase performance: Third round, 1985–86

References

External links

Defunct football clubs in England
Spartan League
Defunct football clubs in London
1966 establishments in England
1996 disestablishments in England
Beckton
Sport in the London Borough of Newham
Association football clubs established in 1966
Association football clubs disestablished in 1996